Huai Jinpeng (born December 1962) is a Chinese computer scientist and politician. He is the current party secretary of the China Association for Science and Technology (CAST) and an academician of the Chinese Academy of Sciences.

Biography
Huai was born in Harbin but traces his ancestry to Jinan, Shandong province. He graduated from Jilin University of Industry (now merged into Jilin University) in 1984. He joined the Chinese Communist Party in January 1986, and began work in September 1987 after obtaining a computer science master's degree at the Harbin Institute of Technology. In November 1993, he earned a doctorate from Beihang University. He also attended Columbia University as a visiting scholar between 1995 and 1996. In December 2000, he was named deputy party chief and vice president of Beihang University. In May 2009, he was promoted to president of the university, obtaining vice-minister level rank. In 2009 he was elected as a member of the Chinese Academy of Science. In 2012, he was awarded the Legion of Honour by the French government for his outstanding contributions to education, science and technology development across China and France.

In February 2015, Huai was named Deputy Minister of Information Technology. In December 2016, Huai was named deputy party chief of Tianjin. In September 2017, Huai was transferred to become party secretary of the China Association for Science and Technology (CAST).

On 20 August 2021, he was appointed Minister of Education.

Huai is a deputy to the 12th National People's Congress and a member of the 19th Central Committee of the Chinese Communist Party.

References

1962 births
Living people
Beihang University alumni
Academic staff of Beihang University
Presidents of Beihang University
Chinese computer scientists
Harbin Institute of Technology alumni
Jilin University alumni
Members of the 19th Central Committee of the Chinese Communist Party
Members of the 20th Central Committee of the Chinese Communist Party
Members of the Chinese Academy of Sciences
Politicians from Harbin
Political office-holders in Tianjin
Scientists from Heilongjiang
Columbia University alumni